Jacobson may refer to:

 Jacobson (surname), including a list of people with the name
 Jacobson, Minnesota, a place in the United States
 Jacobson's, an American regional department store chain

See also 

 Jacobsen (disambiguation)
 Jakobson (disambiguation)
 Jakobsen, a given name and surname
 Jakobsson, a surname
 Jacobsson, a surname
 Jacobs (disambiguation)
 Buegeleisen and Jacobson, American musical instrument seller 
 Jacobson density theorem, in mathematica